Sir Roger Talbot Walters, CBE, FRIBA, FI Struct E, (1917-2010) was a British architect noted for his role in a number of major post-war projects in London from the Thames Barrier to the redevelopment of Covent Garden. He also worked on a number of housing developments across London, including the Palace Road Estate in Tulse Hill, and Brentford Dock and Marina. As Chief Architect of the Greater London Council he developed a more low key style, in contrast to the high rise ethic of the 1970s and pioneered the use of public consultation in architecture.

References

1917 births
2010 deaths
Architects from Hertfordshire
Alumni of the University of Liverpool
Commanders of the Order of the British Empire
Fellows of the Royal Institute of British Architects
People from Chorleywood